GMK may refer to:
 GM Korea, a South Korean automobile manufacturer
 Godzilla, Mothra and King Ghidorah: Giant Monsters All-Out Attack, a 2001 film
 Good Morning Kuya, a Philippine morning news-talk program
 GMK (producer), Nigerian record producer